The National Episcopal Conference of the Congo (French: Conférence Épiscopale Nationale du Congo or CENCO) is the national episcopal conference of the Democratic Republic of the Congo. The conference is a member of the Association of Episcopal Conferences of Central Africa and the Symposium of Episcopal Conferences of Africa and Madagascar (SECAM).

List of presidents of the conference: 

 Vito Roberti, Apostolic Delegate, 1962–1963
 Félix Scalais, Archbishop of Kinshasa, 1963–1964
 Aloys Mulindwa Mutabesha, Archbishop of Bukavu, 1967–1970
 Léon Lesambo Ndamwize, Bishop of Inongo, 1970–1975
 Albert Tshomba Yungu, Bishop of Tshumbe, 1975–1979
 André Ilunga Kaseba, Bishop of Kalemie–Kirungu, 1979–1984
 Laurent Monsengwo Pasinya, Archbishop of Kisangani, 1984–1992
 Faustin Ngabu, Bishop of Goma, 1992–2000
 Frédéric Etsou-Nzabi-Bamungwabi, Archbishop of Kinshasa, 2000–2004
 Laurent Monsengwo Pasinya, Archbishop of Kisangani, Archbishop of Kinshasa, 2004–2008
 Nicolas Djomo Lola, Bishop of Tshumbe, 2008–2016
 Marcel Utembi Tapa, Archbishop of Kisangani, 2016–present

See also
Catholic Church in the Democratic Republic of the Congo

References

External links
 
 http://www.gcatholic.org/dioceses/country/CD.htm
 http://www.catholic-hierarchy.org/country/cd.html 

Congo, Democratic
Catholic Church in the Democratic Republic of the Congo

it:Chiesa cattolica nella Repubblica Democratica del Congo#Conferenza_episcopale